Maria Zelenka (1894–1975) was an Austrian film actress.

Selected filmography
 Alkohol (1919)
 Lola Montez (1919)
 The Grand Babylon Hotel (1920)
 The Blood of the Ancestors (1920)
 Alfred von Ingelheim's Dramatic Life (1921)
 Love and Passion (1921)
 Bummellotte (1922)
 Morass (1922)
 The Girl of the Golden West (1922)
 The Doomed (1924)
 The Adventures of Captain Hasswell (1925)
 The Ascent of Little Lilian (1925)
 Oh Those Glorious Old Student Days (1925)
 Women and Banknotes (1926)
 Watch on the Rhine (1926)
 Children's Tragedy (1928)

References

Bibliography
 Grange, William. Cultural Chronicle of the Weimar Republic. Scarecrow Press, 2008.

External links

1894 births
1975 deaths
Austrian film actresses
Austrian people of Czech descent
Austrian silent film actresses
20th-century Austrian actresses
Actresses from Vienna